Lycurgus is the title of a recording by American folk and blues guitarist Peter Lang, released in 1975. It was nominated for a Grammy award in the Folk music category. Lycurgus was a "Top National Add-on" and "Breakout" in Billboard Magazine. It was reissued in 2003 on the Horus label with additional tracks.

Track listing
All songs by Peter Lang unless otherwise noted.
 "Round Worm Reel" – 2:05
 "That Will Never Happen No More" (Blind Blake) – 2:46
 "Green Apple Quick Step" – 2:16
 "Untitled Oblivion" – 3:03
 "Lycurgus" – 3:44
 "Poor Howard" (Lead Belly) – 2:43
 "Let the Old Boy Go" – 2:23
 "V/ The Connecticut Promissory" – 2:54
 "Zero Adjustment" – 2:55
 "Flames Along the Monongahela" – 7:46
2003 reissue bonus tracks:
 "Untitled Oblivion" (instrumental) – 3:18
 "V/The Connecticut Promissory Rag" (alternate take) – 2:44
 "Zero Adjustment" (instrumental) – 3:15
 "Hello Baby Blues" (Danny Kalb) – 1:58
 "Stackolee" – 1:18

Personnel
Peter Lang – guitar, vocals
Cal Hand – dobro, pedal steel guitar
Dick Hedlund – bass
Bill Hinkley – mandolin
John Lang – voices
Craig Ruble – violin
Bill Evans – bass
Peter Ostroushko – mandolin
Butch Thompson – clarinet, piano

Production
Produced by Peter Lang
Engineered by Paul Martinson, Tom Mudge and Dave "Snaker" Ray
Editing and remastering by Michael McKern
Cover art by Patrick Finnerty

1975 albums
Peter Lang (guitarist) albums